Jonas Strifler (born 30 January 1990) is a German retired footballer who played as a defender or midfielder.

Career
Strifler played as a youth for Karlsruher SC and 1899 Hoffenheim, being promoted to Hoffenheim's reserve team in 2007. He was given a first-team squad number for the 2008-09 season, Hoffenheim's first Bundesliga season, but did not make a first-team appearance.

In September 2009 he signed for Dynamo Dresden and made his debut shortly afterwards, playing at right-back in a 3. Liga match against VfL Osnabrück. He joined Alemannia Aachen in July 2011 but was released a season later after the club were relegated to the 3. Liga, later signing for Wacker Burghausen. He left Burghausen in January 2013, signing for Arminia Bielefeld shortly afterwards.

Strifler has represented Germany at Under-18 and Under-19 level.

External links

1990 births
Living people
German footballers
Germany youth international footballers
TSG 1899 Hoffenheim players
TSG 1899 Hoffenheim II players
Dynamo Dresden players
Alemannia Aachen players
SV Wacker Burghausen players
Arminia Bielefeld players
SV Waldhof Mannheim players
FC Schalke 04 II players
3. Liga players
Association football midfielders
People from Schwetzingen
Sportspeople from Karlsruhe (region)
Footballers from Baden-Württemberg